Borj-e Bahmani (also Romanized as Borj-e Bahmanī) is a village in Dehdasht-e Gharbi Rural District, in the Central District of Kohgiluyeh County, Kohgiluyeh and Boyer-Ahmad Province, Iran. As of the 2006 census, the population was 116, in 18 families.

References 

Populated places in Kohgiluyeh County